Patagonomyrmex is a genus of ants belonging to the family Formicidae.

The species of this genus are found in Southern South America.

Species
Species:

Patagonomyrmex angustus (Mayr, 1870)
Patagonomyrmex laevigatus (Santschi, 1921)
Patagonomyrmex odoratus (Kusnezov, 1949)

References

Ants
Ant genera